The Oldtimers was a Canadian documentary television miniseries which aired on CBC Television from 1974 to 1975.

Premise
This series profiled people who recounted their lives during the late 19th and early 20th century.

Production
The series was a spin-off of a September 1973 special broadcast, The Time of My Life. Donnalu Wigmore tasked producers in various Canadian regions to prepare the various episodes.

The people profiled represented pioneers of regions from Newfoundland to British Columbia. One segment featured the experience of two First Nations women, one of whom was recorded on a treaty in 1877. Another broadcast concerned the Northwest Mounted Police while another concerned northern life.

Scheduling
This half-hour series was broadcast on Mondays at 10:00 p.m. as follows:

 11 November 1974 - The North West Mounted Police (debut)
 18 November 1974
 25 November 1974 - Canadian North
 2 December 1974
 9 December 1974 - The Women - Manitoba (10:30 p.m. due to earlier drama special)
 16 December 1974
 23 December 1974 - Oldtimers of Newfoundland
 30 December 1974 - Oldtimers of Saskatchewan (finale)

Episodes were rebroadcast on Sundays at 2:00 p.m. from 13 April to 29 June 1975.

References

External links
 

CBC Television original programming
1974 Canadian television series debuts
1974 Canadian television series endings
1970s Canadian documentary television series